The 1978 USC Trojans baseball team represented the University of Southern California in the 1978 NCAA Division I baseball season. The team was coached Rod Dedeaux in his 37th season.

The Trojans won the College World Series, defeating the Arizona State Sun Devils in the championship game for the Trojans eleventh and final national championship under Rod Dedeaux.

Roster

Schedule 

! style="background:#FFCC00;color:#990000;"| Regular Season
|- 

|- align="center" bgcolor="ffdddd"
| February 14 || at  || 0–3 || 0–1 || –
|- align="center" bgcolor="ddffdd"
| February 18 || at  || 10–9 || 1–1 || –
|- align="center" bgcolor="ddffdd"
| February 18 || Cal State Fullerton || 9–6 || 2–1 || –
|- align="center" bgcolor="ddffdd"
| February 24 || at  || 23–8 || 3–1 || –
|- align="center" bgcolor="ddffdd"
| February 25 ||  || 9–2 || 4–1 || –
|- align="center" bgcolor="ddffdd"
| February 25 || Saint Mary's || 8–0 || 5–1 || –
|-

|- align="center" bgcolor="ffdddd"
| March 4 || at Arizona State || 9–13 || 5–2 || –
|- align="center" bgcolor="ffdddd"
| March 4 || at Arizona State || 7–13 || 5–3 || –
|- align="center" bgcolor="ddffdd"
| March 7 || Pepperdine || 7–0 || 6–3 || –
|- align="center" bgcolor="ddffdd"
| March 10 ||  || 10–0 || 7–3 || –
|- align="center" bgcolor="#ffdddd"
| March 11 ||  || 2–8 || 7–4 || –
|- align="center" bgcolor="#ddffdd"
| March 11 || UC Irvine || 8–0 || 8–4 || –
|- align="center" bgcolor="ddffdd"
| March 14 ||  || 8–1 || 9–4 || –
|- align="center" bgcolor="ddffdd"
| March 16 ||  || 14–4 || 10–4 || –
|- align="center" bgcolor="ddffdd"
| March 17 || at Cal State Los Angeles || 10–1 || 11–4 || –
|- align="center" bgcolor="ddffdd"
| March 18 || Cal State Los Angeles || 3–2 || 12–4 || –
|- align="center" bgcolor="ddffdd"
| March 19 || at  || 13–1 || 13–4 || –
|- align="center" bgcolor="ddffdd"
| March 20 || at Houston || 10–4 || 14–4 || –
|- align="center" bgcolor="ddffdd"
| March 21 || at  || 5–2 || 15–4 || –
|- align="center" bgcolor="ddffdd"
| March 22 || at Texas A&M || 8–5 || 16–4 || –
|- align="center" bgcolor="ddffdd"
| March 24 || vs.  || 5–2 || 17–4 || –
|- align="center" bgcolor="ddffdd"
| March 24 || at  || 8–2 || 18–4 || –
|- align="center" bgcolor="ddffdd"
| March 25 || at Texas || 3–2 || 19–4 || –
|- align="center" bgcolor="ffdddd"
| March 25 || at Texas || 2–3 || 19–5 || –
|- align="center" bgcolor="ddffdd"
| March 28 ||  || 2–1 || 20–5 || –
|- align="center" bgcolor="ddffdd"
| March 31 || Arizona State || 11–0 || 21–5 || –
|-

|- align="center" bgcolor="ddffdd"
| April 1 || Arizona State || 11–6 || 22–5 || –
|- align="center" bgcolor="ddffdd"
| April 2 || Arizona State || 10–1 || 23–5 || –
|- align="center" bgcolor="ddffdd"
| April 5 ||  || 12–1 || 24–5 || –
|- align="center" bgcolor="ffdddd"
| April 8 || at  || 13–14 || 24–6 || 0–1
|- align="center" bgcolor="ddffdd"
| April 8 || at California || 6–2 || 25–6 || 1–1
|- align="center" bgcolor="#ddffdd"
| April 9 || at  || 7–2 || 26–6 || –
|- align="center" bgcolor="ddffdd"
| April 13 ||  || 7–0 || 27–6 || 2–1
|- align="center" bgcolor="ffdddd"
| April 14 || Stanford || 2–3 || 27–7 || 2–2
|- align="center" bgcolor="ddffdd"
| April 15 || Stanford || 8–3 || 28–7 || 3–2
|- align="center" bgcolor="ddffdd"
| April 18 || Pepperdine || 10–2 || 29–7 || –
|- align="center" bgcolor="#ddffdd"
| April 20 ||  || 6–5 || 30–7 || 4–2
|- align="center" bgcolor="#ddffdd"
| April 21 || at UCLA || 5–4 || 31–7 || 5–2
|- align="center" bgcolor="#ddffdd"
| April 22 || UCLA || 7–3 || 32–7 || 6–2
|- align="center" bgcolor="#ddffdd"
| April 24 || Long Beach State || 12–1 || 33–7 || –
|- align="center" bgcolor="#ddffdd"
| April 27 || California || 11–2 || 34–7 || 7–2
|- align="center" bgcolor="#ddffdd"
| April 28 || California || 14–3 || 35–7 || 8–2
|- align="center" bgcolor="#ddffdd"
| April 29 || California || 11–2 || 36–7 || 9–2
|- align="center" bgcolor="#ddffdd"
| April 30 || California || 7–2 || 37–7 || 10–2
|-

|- align="center" bgcolor="ddffdd"
| May 1 ||  || 11–5 || 38–7 || –
|- align="center" bgcolor="ddffdd"
| May 2 ||  || 15–2 || 39–7 || –
|- align="center" bgcolor="ddffdd"
| May 5 || at Stanford || 17–7 || 40–7 || 11–2
|- align="center" bgcolor="ddffdd"
| May 6 || at Stanford || 4–3 || 41–7 || 12–2
|- align="center" bgcolor="ddffdd"
| May 7 || at Stanford || 12–6 || 42–7 || 13–2
|- align="center" bgcolor="#ffdddd"
| May 9 ||  || 4–6 || 42–8 || –
|- align="center" bgcolor="ddffdd"
| May 11 || at UCLA || 1–0 || 43–8 || 14–2
|- align="center" bgcolor="ddffdd"
| May 12 || UCLA || 7–6 || 44–8 || 15–2
|- align="center" bgcolor="ffdddd"
| May 13 || at UCLA || 8–9 || 44–9 || 15–3
|-

|-
! style="background:#FFCC00;color:#990000;"| Postseason
|-

|- align="center" bgcolor="ddffdd"
| May 20 || vs.  || Buck Bailey Field || 3–2 || 45–9
|- align="center" bgcolor="ddffdd"
| May 21 || vs. Washington State || Buck Bailey Field || 5–4 || 46–9
|-

|- align="center" bgcolor="ddffdd"
| May 26 || vs.  || Dedeaux Field || 3–2 || 47–9
|- align="center" bgcolor="ddffdd"
| May 27 || vs. Cal State Fullerton || Dedeaux Field || 3–2 || 48–9
|- align="center" bgcolor="ddffdd"
| May 28 || vs. Arizona || Dedeaux Field || 2–1 || 49–9
|-

|- align="center" bgcolor="ddffdd"
| June 2 || vs. Miami (FL) || Rosenblatt Stadium || 9–3 || 50–9
|- align="center" bgcolor="ddffdd"
| June 4 || vs. Michigan || Rosenblatt Stadium || 11–3 || 51–9
|- align="center" bgcolor="ddffdd"
| June 6 || vs. Arizona State || Rosenblatt Stadium || 5–2 || 52–9
|- align="center" bgcolor="ddffdd"
| June 7 || vs. North Carolina || Rosenblatt Stadium || 3–2 || 53–9
|- align="center" bgcolor="ddffdd"
| June 8 || vs. Arizona State || Rosenblatt Stadium || 10–3 || 54–9
|-

Awards and honors 
Bill Bordley
 All-America First Team
 Pacific-8 Player of the Year

Rod Boxberger
 College World Series Most Outstanding Player
 All-America First Team

Dave Engle
 All-Pacific-8 First Team

Brian Hayes
 All-Pacific-8 First Team

Dave Hostetler
 All-America Second Team
 College World Series All-Tournament Team

Chris Smith
 All-Pacific-8 First Team

Doug Stokke
 College World Series All-Tournament Team
 All-Pacific-8 First Team

Tim Tolman
 All-America Second Team
 College World Series All-Tournament Team
 All-Pacific-8 First Team

Dave Van Gorder
 All-America First Team

John Wells
 College World Series All-Tournament Team

Trojans in the 1978 MLB Draft 
The following members of the USC baseball program were drafted in the 1978 Major League Baseball Draft.

References 

Usc
USC Trojans baseball seasons
College World Series seasons
NCAA Division I Baseball Championship seasons
Pac-12 Conference baseball champion seasons
USC Trojans